Selk may refer to:

SELK, as a four-letter acronym, the Independent Evangelical-Lutheran Church of Germany (German: Selbständige Evangelisch-Lutherische Kirche).
Serket, an ancient Egyptian scorpion goddess
Selk, Germany, a town in Schleswig-Holstein, Germany
Selk, a sleeping bag with arms and legs (also known as a Selkbag or selk'bag), supposedly relating to the Selknam tribe, indigenous to Tierra del Fuego and other parts of Patagonia
Selk, referring to King Scorpion, or Scorpion II, the second of two kings so-named of Upper Egypt during the Protodynastic Period
Selk (crater), an impact crater on the moon Titan